Tympanocryptis pseudopsephos, the Goldfields pebble-mimic dragon, is a species of agama found in the Goldfields region of Western Australia.

References

pseudopsephos
Endemic fauna of Australia
Agamid lizards of Australia
Taxa named by Paul Doughty
Taxa named by Luke Kealley
Taxa named by Jane Melville
Reptiles described in 2015